Hatun Usnu (Quechua hatun big, usnu altar; a special platform for important celebrations, "big usnu", also known as Qatun Ushno de Toccto) is an archaeological site in Peru on a mountain of the same name (Jatunhosno). It is located in the Ayacucho Region, Huamanga Province, Chiara District.

References 

Archaeological sites in Peru
Archaeological sites in Ayacucho Region
Mountains of Peru
Mountains of Ayacucho Region